The Hall Memorial Library in Ellington, Connecticut was built in 1903 and was the first free public library in the town.  It was designed by New York City architect Wilson Potter.

It is a contributing building in the Ellington Center Historic District, listed on the National Register of Historic Places.

References

Buildings and structures in Tolland County, Connecticut
Ellington, Connecticut